Darko Jukić (born 23 August 1990) is a Danish professional basketball player for Bakken Bears of the Basketligaen. He is also a member of the Danish national basketball team. He is a two-time Basketligaen champion and one time Most Valuable Player.

Professional career
On 6 July 2016, Jukić signed a one-year contract with KK Krka of the Slovenian Premier A. After a year in Slovenia, he returned to Bakken Bears.

On 8 July 2019, he extended his contract with the Bears for two more seasons.

International career
Jukić plays for the Danish national team.

References

External links
Profile on fibaeurope.com
Profile on eurobasket.com
Profile on realgm.com

1990 births
Living people
Bakken Bears players
Danish expatriate basketball people in Italy
Danish expatriate sportspeople in Germany
Danish men's basketball players
Danish people of Croatian descent
Horsens IC players
KK Krka players
Ratiopharm Ulm players
Small forwards
Södertälje Kings players
Sportspeople from Copenhagen